A green sheet accompanies a prospectus or preliminary prospectus for most initial public offerings.  They describe the basic terms of the offering that are of the most important to a registered representative such as: sales concession, investment merits, and risks.   

A registered representative and their clients rarely read a prospectus.  The registered representative can use material in the Green Sheet to decide if they want to offer the issue to their clients, and they may elect to read the prospectus if they feel more diligence is warranted.  It is a violation of securities regulations for a registered representative to distribute a green sheet outside their dealer firm.

Initial public offering
Stock market